The Whippoorwill is the third studio album by American southern/country rock band Blackberry Smoke. It was released on August 14, 2012 through Southern Ground Records in the North America and on February 17, 2014 through Earache Records in Europe. The latter contained three additional live tracks; "Country Side of Life", "Pretty Little Lie" and "Six Ways to Sunday".

Track listing

Personnel

Musicians 
Charlie Starr - lead vocals, guitar, pedal steel, banjo. 
Richard Turner - bass guitar, vocals.
Paul Jackson - guitar, vocals. 
Brandon Still - piano, organ.
Brit Turner - drums, percussion.

Additional musicians 
 Clay Cook - percussion, harmonium (4).
 Matt Mangano - acoustic guitar (4).
 Maureen Murphy, Lo Carter, Kyla Jade - backing vocals (3,9,12,13).
 Sarah Dugas - backing vocals (9).
 Arnold McCuller -backing vocals (6,10,13).
Brendan Wallace - Bagpipes

Production 
 Blackberry Smoke, Clay Cook, Matt Mangano, Zac Brown - producers.
 Matt Wallace, Mike Fraser - mixing.
 Stephen Marcussen - mastering.
 Trey Wilson - production coordinator.
 Brit Turner - art direction.
 Justin Helton, Tim Pederson - cover design.
 David Stuart - photography.

Chart performance
The album debuted on the Top Country Albums chart at No. 59 before their album's official release in August 2012, and re-entered the chart 4 weeks later at No.8 on its official release (chart date September 1, 2012).  It also debuted on Billboard 200 at No. 40 on its official release, as well as No. 10 on the Independent Albums chart and No. 12 on the Top Rock Albums chart.  The album has sold 51,000 copies in the US as of October 2012.

The album was released in the UK in February 2014, and it debuted at No.30 on the UK album Top 100 chart and No. 1 on the UK Country Album Chart with 2,973 copies sold for the week.

Album

Singles

References

2012 albums
Blackberry Smoke albums
Earache Records albums